Ursus minimus (the Auvergne bear) is an extinct species of bear, endemic to Europe during the Pliocene and Pleistocene, living from 5.3 to 1.8 Mya, existing for about .

U. minimus appears to have given rise to Ursus etruscus. The range of U. minimus was continental Europe as far east as the Black Sea in Russia and as far south as Italy.

The skeleton of U. minimus was very similar to that of the larger Asian black bear. With the exception of the age of the bones, it is often difficult to distinguish the remains of U. minimus from those of modern Asian black bears.

Fossil distribution
Sites and specimen ages:
Kossiakino 1, Stavropol'skaya, Russian Federation ~5.3—3.4 Mya.
Kuchurgan gravel site, Ukraine ~4.9—4.2 Mya.
Osztramos locality 7, Caves of Aggtelek Karst and Slovak Karst, Borsod-Abaúj-Zemplén County, Hungary ~3.4—1.8 Mya.
Seneze (Domeyrat) site, France ~3.4—1.8 Mya.
Meleto site, Tuscany, Italy ~3.2—2.5 Mya.

References

 Tracking the origins of the cave bear (Ursus spelaeus) by mitochondrial DNA sequencing

Pliocene bears
Pliocene extinctions
Prehistoric mammals of Europe
Fossil taxa described in 1827